Aftab Ahmed (date of birth unknown) was a Pakistani cricketer. Primarily a batsman, all of Aftab's matches at first-class level came for Peshawar, during the 1956–57 and 1957–58 seasons of the Quaid-e-Azam Trophy. He made his debut for the team in December 1956, against Punjab at the Peshawar Club Ground, a match which Peshawar lost by an innings and 169 runs after Fazal Mahmood took 8/21 in the team's first innings. The position in which Aftab batted was irregular; in his first match, he had opened the batting, but in later matches he batted as low as tenth. He played one further match during the 1956–57 season, and three the following season, but rarely made more than single-figure score. His highest score was an innings of 33 runs against Railways in October 1957. Having scored only 51 runs from his eight innings for Peshawar, at an average of 7.71, Aftab played no further matches at first-class level.

References

20th-century births
Living people
Pakistani cricketers
Peshawar cricketers
Place of birth missing (living people)
Year of birth missing (living people)